Chad Johnson (born 1978; formerly Chad Ochocinco) is an American football wide receiver.

Chad Johnson may also refer to:

 Chad Johnson (ice hockey) (born 1986), Canadian ice hockey goaltender
 Chad S. Johnson (born 1967), American attorney and political activist
 Chad Johnson (TV personality), contestant on The Bachelorette and Bachelor in Paradise

See also 
 Chad (name)